Methling is a surname. Notable people with the surname include:

Sven Methling (1918–2005), Danish film director and screenwriter
Svend Methling (1891–1977), Danish actor and film director, father of Sven

Danish-language surnames